The Sognefjord Spans are the second, third, and fourth longest spans in the world situated east of Hermansverk, Norway and are part of different powerlines. As Sognefjord Span is a deep valley the pylons of these spans are not taller than ordinary pylons. In order to avoid any too close approaches or contacts between the conductors, each is mounted on a separate pylon at the end of the span, which is built as a steel framework tower.

Span 1 
This span is part of the powerline between Hermansverk   and Vikøyri   and was built in the 1950s. It has a length of 4850 metres and was until the inauguration of Ameralik Span the longest span in the world. The span, which crosses Sognefjord in North-South direction, has 4 conductors, whereby one is for reserve. Its northern ends are at
 
 
 

and its southern ends are at
   
 
.

Span 2 
Just a few hundred meters east of Span 1, the powerline between Sogndal  and Hove  substations crosses Sognefjord with a 4520 meters long spanning East-West direction. As Span 1 it has 4 conductors, whereby 1 is as reserve.
The locations of the towers used for this span are at its western end:     

and at its eastern end:

Span 3 
Approximately 9 kilometres east-south east of these spans, there crosses the line from Aurland1  to Langedøla  Sognefjord in a span with a length of 4500 metres in North-South direction. It has no reserve conductor and consists therefore of 3 ropes. Its towers are situated at its southern end at  

and at its north end at
.

See also

 List of spans

External links
 https://web.archive.org/web/20090815162655/http://www.statnett.no/en/News/Highest-and-longest/
 http://www.sffarkiv.no/sffbasar/default.asp?p=result&db=dbatlas_leks&art_id=4611&spraak_id=1&ptype=single&lang=eng&paging=yes

Powerline river crossings
Buildings and structures in Vestland
Energy in Norway
Leikanger